The Cathedral of the Risen Christ is the mother church of the Roman Catholic Diocese of Lincoln, Nebraska, United States.

The cathedral parish traces its roots back to Holy Family Church, a parish founded in 1926 and organized in 1932. On June 20, 1963, the construction was begun on Cathedral of the Risen Christ. The new cathedral was dedicated on August 18, 1965.

Eucharistic adoration has continued in the cathedral parish perpetually since October 1, 1959.

See also
List of Catholic cathedrals in the United States
List of cathedrals in the United States

References

External links 
Cathedral website
Roman Catholic Diocese of Lincoln
Cathedral of the Risen Christ School

 

Churches in the Roman Catholic Diocese of Lincoln
Risen Christ
Buildings and structures in Lincoln, Nebraska
Christian organizations established in 1926
Roman Catholic churches completed in 1965
Tourist attractions in Lincoln, Nebraska
Modernist architecture in Nebraska
Churches in Lancaster County, Nebraska
20th-century Roman Catholic church buildings in the United States